Riverview, Ohio may refer to:

Riverview, Belmont County, Ohio
Riverview, Muskingum County, Ohio
Riverview, Washington County, Ohio